An autobiographical novel is a form of novel using autofiction techniques, or the merging of autobiographical and fictive elements. The literary technique is distinguished from an autobiography or memoir by the stipulation of being fiction. Because an autobiographical novel is partially fiction, the author does not ask the reader to expect the text to fulfill the "autobiographical pact". Names and locations are often changed and events are recreated to make them more dramatic but the story still bears a close resemblance to that of the author's life.  While the events of the author's life are recounted, there is no pretense of exact truth. Events may be exaggerated or altered for artistic or thematic purposes.

Novels that portray settings and/or situations with which the author is familiar are not necessarily autobiographical. Neither are novels that include aspects drawn from the author's life as minor plot details. To be considered an autobiographical novel by most standards, there must be a protagonist modeled after the author and a central plotline that mirrors events in his or her life.

Novels that do not fully meet these requirements or are further distanced from true events are sometimes called semi-autobiographical novels.

Many novels about intense, private experiences such as war, family conflict or sex, are written as autobiographical novels.

Some works openly refer to themselves as "non-fiction novels". The definition of such works remains vague. The term was first widely used in reference to the non-autobiographical In Cold Blood by Truman Capote but has since become associated with a range of works drawing openly from autobiography. The emphasis is on the creation of a work that is essentially true, often in the context of an investigation into values or some other aspect of reality. The books Zen and the Art of Motorcycle Maintenance by Robert M. Pirsig and The Tao of Muhammad Ali by Davis Miller open with statements admitting to some fictionalising of events but state they are true "in essence".

Notable autobiographical novels

Notes

See also 

 Autofiction
 Autobiografiction
 Biography in literature
 Roman à clef

References 

Literary genres
 
Novels about writers